Los tres García ("The Three Garcias") is a 1947 Mexican comedy film. It stars Pedro Infante, Abel Salazar and Carlos Orellana.

For the film's exterior shots, the Delegation or City of Cuajimalpa (within modern Mexico City), was used, specially Parroquia San Pedro Apostol, which still provides religious services.  Pedro Infante fell in love with the town, the locals and countryside, to the point of building a large mansion just outside Cuajimalpa. He lived there until his death in 1957. The house stood there until the 1990s; it was later demolished and Husky Injection Molding Systems Mexico was constructed on the same site. The northwest exterior wall that surrounded Pedro's property still stands to this day.

A sequel, Vuelven los García (The Garcias Return) was released a few months later the same year.

Cast
Pedro Infante as Luis Antonio García
Sara García as Grandma Luisa García
Marga López as Lupita Smith García
Abel Salazar as José Luis García
Víctor Manuel Mendoza as Luis Manuel García
Carlos Orellana as Priest
Fernando Soto as Tranquilino
Antonio R. Frausto as Mayor Don Cosme
Clifford Carr as Mr. John Smith

External links
 

1947 films
1940s Spanish-language films
Mexican black-and-white films
Mexican comedy films
1947 comedy films
1940s Mexican films